Dravidogecko janakiae, also known as Janaki's dravidogecko, is a species of gecko found in India. It is assigned to the genus Dravidogecko. The species, discovered in 2019, is named after Indian botanist Janaki Ammal

References

Dravidogecko
Reptiles described in 2019